Jabari Zuniga (born August 14, 1997) is an American football defensive end for the New Orleans Saints of the National Football League (NFL). He played college football at Florida and was drafted by the New York Jets in the third round of the 2020 NFL Draft.

Early life and high school
Zuniga grew up in Marietta, Georgia, the son of Tammy Thompson and Carlos Zuniga and attended Sprayberry High School. He originally only played basketball at Sprayberry and did not start playing football until his junior year. Rated a four-star prospect by 247Sports.com, Zuniga initially committed to play college football at NC State. He de-committed and eventually chose to attend the University of Florida over Arkansas.

College career
Zuniga redshirted his true freshman season. He played in all 13 of the Gators' games with three starts as a redshirt freshman, recording 25 tackles, 8.5 tackles-for-loss and a team-best 5.0 sacks with 11 quarterback hurries and a forced fumble. As a redshirt sophomore, Zuniga made 34 tackles, 8.0 tackles-for-loss, four sacks in ten games played (six starts). He started all 13 of Florida's games the following season and finished the year 45 tackles and finished second on the team with 11.0 tackles for loss along 6.5 sacks. Zuniga was named the Southeastern Conference Defensive Lineman of the Week for Week 3 after recording 2.5 sacks against Colorado State. He initially contemplated forgoing his final year of NCAA eligibility to enter the 2019 NFL Draft, but ultimately decided to return to Florida for his redshirt senior season.

Zuniga entered his redshirt senior season as a preseason first-team All-SEC selection. He was named to the watchlist for the Chuck Bednarik Award midway through the season. Zuniga suffered a high ankle sprain against Kentucky, causing him to miss the next two games, and then re-injured his ankle against Georgia and missed the final four games of the regular season. He returned to play in the 2019 Orange Bowl and finished the season with 14 tackles, 7 tackles for a loss, and 3 sacks.

Professional career

New York Jets
Zuniga was selected by the New York Jets in the third round, 79th overall, of the 2020 NFL Draft. He was placed on injured reserve on September 7, 2020. He was designated to return from injured reserve on October 7, and began practicing with the team again. He was activated on October 28.

On September 1, 2021, Zuniga was waived by the Jets and re-signed to the practice squad the next day. He was promoted to the active roster on January 5, 2022.

On August 30, 2022, Zuniga was waived by the Jets.

Seattle Seahawks
On September 5, 2022, the Seahawks added Zuniga to their practice squad. He was released on October 12.

New Orleans Saints
On October 18, 2022, Zuniga was signed to the New Orleans Saints practice squad. He signed a reserve/future contract on January 9, 2023.

References

External links
Florida Gators bio
New York Jets bio

1997 births
Living people
Players of American football from Marietta, Georgia
American football defensive ends
American football linebackers
Florida Gators football players
New York Jets players
Seattle Seahawks players
New Orleans Saints players